Gyan Mukherjee (30 September 1909 – 13 November 1956) was an Indian film director and screenwriter, who worked in Hindi cinema, best known for the hits Jhoola (1941) and Kismet (1943).

Early life 
Mukherjee was born on 30 September 1909 in Benares, United Provinces (now Uttar Pradesh), British India. He graduated with a degree in science.

Career

Early career 
Mukherjee started his career with New Theatres in Calcutta (now Kolkata), and subsequently joined Bombay Talkies as a supervising technician. Soon became a trendsetter of "formula film" starting with first directorial venture Geeta (1940) based on the theme, "Crime-doesn't-pay", "Boy meets girl" was used in  Jhoola (1941).

1943—1956 
In 1943, he reused the formula of Geeta to direct the biggest hit of his career, Kismet  (1943), which also add another formula of "lost-and-found", which remained popular for several decades in Hindi films. The film had Ashok Kumar, the leading star of the era, playing an anti-hero and also appearing in a double role. The film had a strong-anti British sentiment and also featured the noted patriotic song, "Door hato O Duniya walon, Hindustan Hamara Hai" (Leave People of World, India is Ours) by Kavi Pradeep, and went on to run at Roxy Cinema in Calcutta for 3 years and 8 months. Subhash K. Jha has called Kismet as one of the most influential films of all times" in Indian cinema.

After death of Himanshu Rai, founder of Bombay Talkies Studio in 1940, a group led by producer Sashadhar Mukherjee along with production controller Rai Bahadur Chunilal, actor Ashok Kumar and Mukherjee, broke away to establish the Filmistan studio in March 1943 at the premises of old Sharada Movietone studios in Goregaon, Mumbai. He retouched the concept of anti-hero in Sangram (1950), today his works are seen as early depictions of the underworld and the anti-hero in Indian cinema.

While working at Bombay Talkies, auteur Guru Dutt trained under him, though he also assisted Amiya Chakravarty, Dutt emulated Mukherjee's formula-based film style in his early films and eventually dedicated his classic, Pyaasa (1957) to Mukherjee, Another noted director, who assisted him at Bombay Talkies, was Shakti Samanta, who later made Aradhana (1969) and Amar Prem (1972).

Death 
Mujherjee died on 13 November 1956 in Calcutta (now Kolkata), at the age of 47. Guru Dutt's Kaagaz Ke Phool (1959) is considered to be an homage to Mukherjee.

Filmography

References

Bibliography

External links
 
 

Film directors from Uttar Pradesh
1909 births
1956 deaths
Artists from Varanasi
Bengali people
Hindi-language film directors
Indian male screenwriters
20th-century Indian film directors
Screenwriters from Uttar Pradesh
Hindi screenwriters
20th-century Indian dramatists and playwrights
20th-century Indian screenwriters
20th-century Indian male writers